Inverness Caledonian Thistle F.C. in their tenth season in the Scottish Football League competed in the Scottish First Division, Scottish League Cup, Scottish Challenge Cup and the Scottish Cup in season 2003–04. They won their first major trophy when they won the Challenge Cup beating Airdrie United in the final 2–0 with goals from Steve Hislop and David Bingham, and at the end of the season, they won the First Division Championship and securing promotion to the Scottish Premier League. However, SPL rules at that time stated that all member clubs must have a stadium with a minimum capacity of 10,000 seats. Caledonian Stadium did not and this left the club's board with a dilemma: either to stay in the First Division like Falkirk the previous season or to groundshare with Aberdeen's Pittodrie Stadium, over 100 miles (160 km) away. After consulting with supporters, the board decided the sacrifice of one season in Aberdeen would be worthwhile for Premier League football.

Results

Scottish First Division

Final League table

Scottish League Cup

Scottish Challenge Cup

Scottish Cup

Hat-tricks

References
caleythistleonline

Inverness Caledonian Thistle F.C. seasons
Inverness